Eremophila georgei is a flowering plant in the figwort family, Scrophulariaceae and is endemic to Western Australia. It is a common, widespread shrub in central areas of the state, often growing on rocky ridges and hillsides and has serrated leaves and mauve, purple or pink flowers.

Description
The leaves are also covered on both surfaces with white hairs and raised glands.

The tube is mauve, purple or pink on the outside and white inside. The outside is covered with hairs, the inside surface of the petal lobes is glabrous and the inside of the tube is densely filled with woolly hairs. The 4 stamens are fully enclosed within the tube.

Taxonomy and naming
Eremophila georgei was first formally described by Ludwig Diels in 1905 and the description was published in Botanische Jahrbücher für Systematik, Pflanzengeschichte und Pflanzengeographie. The specific epithet (georgei) honours William George, a mine manager on the Mount Margaret goldfields, who collected the type specimen in 1902.

Distribution and habitat
This eremophila is common in central areas of Western Australia growing in sand, clay and stony soils on flats and rocky ridges in the Avon Wheatbelt, Central Ranges, Coolgardie, Gascoyne, Gibson Desert, Great Victoria Desert, Murchison, Nullarbor and Yalgoo biogeographic regions

Conservation status
Eremophila georgei is classified as "not threatened" by the Western Australian Government Department of Parks and Wildlife.

Use in horticulture
This eremophila is an attractive species due in part to its large, colourful flowers which are often present over a long period. It can be grown from cuttings or by grafting onto Myoporum rootstock and the latter method is preferable if the shrub is to be grown in heavy soils or in areas of high humidity. Cuttings may take months to strike, even in warm weather. The plant will grow in full sun or dappled shade, needs little watering and is frost tolerant when mature.

References

georgei
Eudicots of Western Australia
Plants described in 1905
Endemic flora of Western Australia
Taxa named by Ludwig Diels